Topcroft is a village and a civil parish in the English county of Norfolk. The village lies close to the B1527 road.

The villages name means 'Topi's small enclosed field'.

The parish had a population of 265 at the 2011 census. A notable resident of Topcroft is the artist Hannah Giffard, creator of  Pablo the Little Red Fox, an animated television series for children.

History
Topcroft has an entry in the Domesday Book of 1085. In the great book Topcroft is recorded by the name Topercroft and Topercropt and was part of the holdings of Eudo FitzSpirwic, Berenger from Saint Edmund's.

The population peaked in the 1851 census at 477 people, falling to a low of 257 in 1931 and staying stable at this level since then.

During World War II RAF Hardwick was built just to the south-west of the parish boundary. The airfield was operated by Bombardment groups of the US Eighth Air Force during the war and closed in 1945.

The church of Saint Margaret
The parish church is dedicated to Saint Margaret. It is one of 124 existing round-tower churches in Norfolk.

Culture and community
Topcroft Cricket Club is based in the village with the First XI playing in the Norfolk Cricket Alliance Division 1

References

Villages in Norfolk
Civil parishes in Norfolk